Abanga Abakar (born 28 April 1994) is a Chadian professional football player. He has made one appearance for the Chad national football team.

See also
 List of Chad international footballers

References

External links
 

1994 births
Living people
Chadian footballers
Chad international footballers
Place of birth missing (living people)
Association football midfielders